The 2015–16 Villanova Wildcats women's basketball team is representing Villanova University in the 2015–16 NCAA Division I women's basketball season. The Wildcats, led by thirty-eighth year head coach Harry Perretta, they played their games at The Pavilion and were members of the Big East Conference. They finished the season 20–12, 12–6 in Big East play to finish in a tie for second place. They lost in the quarterfinals of the Big East women's tournament to Creighton. They were invited to the Women's National Invitation Tournament where they defeated Liberty in the first round before losing to Bucknell in the second.

Roster

Rankings
2015–16 NCAA Division I women's basketball rankings

Schedule

|-
!colspan=9 style="background:#013974; color:#67CAF1;"| Exhibition

|-
!colspan=9 style="background:#013974; color:#67CAF1;"| Non-conference regular season

|-
!colspan=9 style="background:#013974; color:#67CAF1;"| Big East regular season

|-
!colspan=9 style="background:#013974; color:#67CAF1;"| Big East Women's Tournament

|-
!colspan=9 style="background:#013974; color:#67CAF1;"| WNIT

See also
 2015–16 Villanova Wildcats men's basketball team

References

Villnova
Villanova Wildcats women's basketball seasons
2016 Women's National Invitation Tournament participants
Villa
Villa